The fifth and final season of American dark comedy series Search Party was released on HBO Max on January 7, 2022. The season consists of ten episodes, each with an approximate running time of 25 minutes.

Season five centers Dory's search for enlightenment in the wake of her near-death experience (shown in the finale of season four) and an extended stay at a psychiatric facility. She collaborates with a tech billionaire (portrayed by Jeff Goldblum) to develop an enlightenment pill, which leads her to become a cult leader. Dory rekindles her relationship with Drew and begins a romance with Portia, who quickly becomes a devotee. Elliott seeks the pill to control his unsettling adoptive son. 

The season received positive reception and holds a 100% rating on Rotten Tomatoes.

Plot
"Search Party Season 5 sees Dory (Shawkat) enter a very public business partnership with charismatic tech billionaire Tunnel Quinn, played by guest star Jeff Goldblum, on the other side of her near death experience. Dory folds her old friends Portia (Hagner), Elliott (Early) and Drew (Reynolds) into the venture as they embark on an altruistic but terrifying journey."

Cast

Main
 Alia Shawkat as Dory Sief
 John Reynolds as Drew Gardner
 John Early as Elliott Goss
 Meredith Hagner as Portia Davenport

Recurring
 Clare McNulty as Chantal Witherbottom
Jefferey Self as Marc, Elliott's romantic partner
Jeff Goldblum as Tunnel Quinn, a tech billionaire 
 Kathy Griffin as Liquorice, a conspiracy theorist who claims to receive letters from the future
Kayden Alexander Koshelev as Aspen, Elliott and Marc's adoptive son
Aparna Nancherla as Dr. Benny Balthazar
Angela Trimbur as Elodie Revlon
Grace Kuhlenschmidt as Pepper Southerland
Greta Titelman as Leonora Hamsdale
Joe Castle Baker as Marty Plushfeld
Larry Owens as Ritchie Thinky
Michelle Badillo as Winnie Miranda 
Constance Shulman as Helen
Brian O'Neill as Mick
 John Waters as Sheffield, the head of a boutique adoption agency
Rosemary Harris as archduchess Beatrice Hamsdale
Trudy Styler as duchess Winnifred Hamsdale, a character based on Catherine Oxenberg
 Sean Allan Krill as Sydney Muscat, UNN News Anchor

Guest starring 
 Jimmy Fowlie as Dogey
 Damian Young as Bob Steelhead
 Illeana Douglas, Lou Diamond Phillips, Scott Adsit, Michael Ian Black and Denise Cormier as the members of the Jesper Society, a parody of the Losers Club from It
 Naomi Ekperigin and Joe Pera as coroners
 Abby Elliott as Dr. Baby
 Christine Taylor as Gail
 Griffin Newman as Gavin

Episodes

Production

Development
HBO Max renewed Search Party for a fifth season on February 9, 2021. On November 9, 2021, it was announced that the season would be released on January 7, 2022 and that it would be the final season. Series co-creators Sarah-Violet Bliss, Charles Rogers, and Michael Showalter remained as co-executive producers with Lilly Burns and Tony Hernandez.

Rogers and Bliss focused season five's plot on the themes of rebirth and enlightenment as the logical next step after the season four finale, in which Dory is technically dead for a momentary period. They studied personal accounts of near-death experiences as well as media related to cults and cult leaders. Dory's spiritual leader persona was also inspired by public figures including Deepak Chopra, Bhagwan Shree Rajneesh, Marianne Williamson, and Ram Dass. Rogers and Bliss described Dory's descent into becoming a cult leader with good intentions as a "full circle" transition from season one, when her altruism also transformed into narcissism.

The season was shot in New York and production wrapped in the summer of 2021.

Casting
Jeff Goldblum was cast in a recurring role on July 8, 2021, followed by the casting of Kathy Griffin, also recurring, on August 11, 2021.
 
On November 29, 2021 the casting of recurring cast members Angela Trimbur, Grace Kuhlenschmidt, Greta Titelman, Joe Castle Baker, Larry Owens, Michelle Badillo, and Aparna Nancherla was announced.

Release 
The season premiered on HBO Max on January 7, 2022 with all ten episodes released simultaneously.

Critical reception 
Season five of Search Party received positive critical reception. It holds a 100% on Rotten Tomatoes with an average rating of 8.1/10 based on ten critics' reviews. Naveen Kumar of them. hailed the series: "Among a swelling array of TV shows that lampoon navel-gazing Millennials, Search Party has stood out for its mordant humor, razor-sharp wit, and pitch-black plot." The A.V. Club's Saloni Gajjar rated the season a B+ and described it positively: "The HBO Max comedy dials up the absurdity in the last few episodes of season five, mostly pulling off a whiplash-inducing third act pivot like no other TV show can, thanks to a virtuoso but vastly underrated cast." 

The performance of the main cast was praised by several critics. Series co-creator Sarah-Violet Bliss commended Alia Shawkat's performance as lead character Dory Sief throughout the five seasons: "The comedy was on the page, but when I had imagined the character, she was a little bit less self-possessed. What Alia brought was intelligence and maturity — she made her grounded and real."

Critics noted that the series continued to bend genres, as it has taken on the style of true crime, legal drama, noir, horror, and psychological thriller across the first four seasons. Time writer Judy Berman characterized season five as "surreal sci-fi", fantasy, and a "strange existential comedy." The unusual tone was described as "frankly, bananas" in Thrillist. 

Slash writer Valerie Ettenhofer stated that the season's satirical focus is consistent with the overall series: "No matter how pie-in-the-sky it gets, "Search Party' is still, at its core, a biting satire about the rich and soulless...In the season premiere, Elliott makes plain the type of hollowness the series loves to poke at, saying gleefully, "We're adults, and adults don't care about making a difference!"" Esther Zuckerman of Thrillist described the characters as those who "want fulfillment by cutting corners. They don't want to do the work. They want an easy fix—something outside of themselves that will cure their unending melancholy."

Brian Tallerico of The Playlist described the season as "inconsistent as the show has ever been in terms of plotting and theme" but praised the show's humor, "insane structure", and twist ending. Multiple critics connected the off-the-wall tone and plotting to the destabilizing and unprecedented events that took place in the United States between Search Party's 2016 debut and 2022 finale. Daniel Kurland rated the season 5/5 stars in a review for Den of Geek, and further praised the ending: "I’m still a little speechless for the direction that Search Party ultimately takes and where it ends. The story reaches a ridiculous place, but the world has become so destabilizing that Search Party’s bold choices actually work and come across as smart satire."

References

External links 
List of episodes at IMDb

2022 American television seasons
Television series about cults
Works about cults
Fiction about cults